This is the discography of the Canadian rock band Wide Mouth Mason.

Studio albums

Live albums

Compilation albums

Singles

References

External links
 Official Website of Wide Mouth Mason
 Official Fan Network of Wide Mouth Mason

Discographies of Canadian artists

Rock music group discographies